Amrutanjan is an analgesic balm manufactured and distributed by Amrutanjan Healthcare.

History
Amrutanjan was founded in 1893 by journalist and freedom fighter, Kasinathuni Nageswara Rao. He popularized the balm by distributing it free-of-cost at music concerts. Even today, the words "Bombay" are inscribed along with Amrutanjan on the lid of its most well-known product, the pain balm. In 1936, Amrutanjan became a public limited company with the name Amrutanjan Limited.

Medical uses
It is used as a balm for:
 Headache
 Muscular ache
 Muscular strain
 Arthritis

Holding company
The brand is owned by the parent Amrutanjan Healthcare. It is now headed by Sambhu Prasad, the grandson of Nageshwara Rao.

References

External links
 Official site

Analgesics
Pain
Drug brand names
Products introduced in 1893